Magy (マギー Magī, born Yūichi Kojima, 児島雄一 Kojima Yūichi, on May 12, 1972) is a Japanese actor.

Filmography

Dramas
1999 Naomi
2004 Neo the Office Chuckler
2005 AIBOU: Tokyo Detective Duo
2005 Haruka Seventeen - Kengo Kuriyama
2019 Scarlet
2021 Influence
2021 Karei-naru Ichizoku

Films
 2004 Crying Out Love, In the Center of the World
 2006 Death Note 2: The Last Name - Yuji Demegawa
 2008 Climber's High
 2018 Perfect World
 2021 Baragaki: Unbroken Samurai - Ōsawa Ippei
 2021 Rika: Love Obsessed Psycho
 2021 99.9 Criminal Lawyer: The Movie

References

External links
 Magy's website
 

Living people
Japanese male actors
1972 births